Best of the Geto Boys is a compilation album by the rap group Geto Boys, released in 2008.

Track listing 
Tracks overlap for a few seconds.

References 

Geto Boys albums
1996 greatest hits albums
Rap-A-Lot Records compilation albums
Gangsta rap compilation albums